The Technical and Vocational University (TVU) (Danushgah-e Feni-ye Herfehai)  includes higher education that runs all technical/vocational colleges across the country. The main objective of this University, training technicians in the majors technical. 4/5 of majors are belongs to Associate degree and 1/5 belongs to Bachelor's degree.

The university has more than 176 schools and colleges across the country, and with more than 180 thousand students, it is one of the largest universities in Iran. there are all of the technical and vocational Majors.

Shamsipour Technical and Vocational College is the best college of the Technical and Vocational University.

History

Chancellors

Important colleges

References

External links
 Shamsipour Technical and Vocational College

 
Educational institutions established in 1965
1965 establishments in Iran